The Democracy Ranking is an index compiled by the Association for Development and Advancement of the Democracy Award, an Austria-based non-partisan organization. Democracy Ranking produces an annual global ranking of liberal democracies. The applied conceptual formula, which measures the quality of democracy, integrates freedom and other characteristics of the political system with the performance of non-political dimensions (gender, economy, knowledge, health, and environment). Democracy Ranking has emphasized a broader understanding of democracy, creating a conceptual link between politics and the output and performance of society. The Democracy Ranking has compared several-year intervals, delivering ranking results, which show how ranking positions and score levels have developed recently. Referring to that information, a Democracy Improvement Ranking has been regularly released.

Ranking 2016
Source:

Vision
"The Democracy Ranking is interested in contributing to the global enhancement of the Quality of Democracy in a world-wide understanding and approach."

Theory, conceptual formula and methodology
The Democracy Ranking initiative applies the following conceptual formula for defining democracy and measuring the quality of democracy:

 Quality of Democracy = (freedom & other characteristics of the political system) & (performance of the non-political dimensions).

This approach includes also the output of democracies. Democracy Ranking refers to countries (country-based democracies) with a population of one million or more and that are classified by Freedom House as "free" or at least as "partly free" (see also the Freedom House report). The Democracy Ranking makes explicit the "theoretical basis", which governs the theoretical self-understanding of the Democracy Ranking.

The Democracy Ranking understands and measures democracies in a multi-dimensional framework and approach. By this, the Democracy Ranking contributes to a further development of measurement of democracy. According to the ranking, democracy consists of six dimensions (one political, five non-political), with different weights for the overall quality of democracy. Their weights are distributed accordingly:

 politics (or the political system) 50%; 
 gender (gender equality in socioeconomic and educational terms) 10%; 
 economy (or the economic system) 10%; 
 knowledge (knowledge society, research and education) 10%; 
 health (or the health system and health status) 10%; 
 and environment (environmental sustainability) 10%.

The theoretical basis of the Democracy Ranking encourages a broader approach for explaining and measuring democracy while covering and integrating non-political dimensions. This is enabled by an understanding that democracy represents not only a concept of the political system, but also a concept that extends to society and the context of society, and includes interfaces between politics, society, economy, and even the environment. Politics (policy) has or should have a responsibility for economic (socioeconomic) performance. Furthermore, there is also a need that democracy reflects the context of the (natural) environment.

Concepts of democracy turn out to be more demanding, the more they move from a mainly electoral democracy (emphasizing elections and political rights) to a liberal democracy (also encompassing civil liberties), and further extending to a liberal democracy of an advanced high quality. In that logic, the Democracy Ranking reflects and requires a "demanding type" of democracy.

Methodically, the Democracy Ranking does not create new indicators, but relies on already existing indicators that are being released regularly by renowned international and/or private non-profit organizations. The Democracy Ranking draws on available indicators according to a distinct conceptual formula and six-fold dimensional structure, thus providing a theoretically based conceptual design (a basic concept) of how to combine and aggregate these indicators. Depending on the source, the content of the indicators varies, extending from peer review assessment (for example, on freedom) to indicators that capture performance (e.g., socioeconomic behavior). The Democracy Ranking initiative acknowledges the work of organizations such as Freedom House, the World Bank, and also the United Nations Development Program (more specifically the Human Development Index).

Reflections on the Democracy Ranking
The work of the Democracy Ranking is being reflected in academic discourse and in coverage by international media.

Democracy Ranking
The Democracy Ranking analyzes several-year intervals, revealing relative ranking positions as well as changes of score levels over time. Typically, more than hundred countries are being compared in context of a specific Democracy Ranking. Based on ranking results and their shifts, a Democracy Improvement Ranking is being carried out, with a full result release. The Democracy Improvement Ranking places the emphasis on increases or decreases of the ranking scores of democracies. Individual annual rankings of the Democracy Ranking are also published in separate book volumes.

See also

References

External links

Official links
 Democracy Ranking

Democracy Ranking 2014
 Democracy Improvement Ranking 2014

Democracy
Indexes
Research institutes in Austria